Mercedes Partido is a partido in the eastern part of Buenos Aires Province in Argentina.

Settlements
 Agote
 Altamira
 García
 Goldney
 Gowland
 La Verde
 Mercedes
 San Jacinto
 Tomás Jofré

Population growth
1980: 51,207 
1991: 55,685 
2001: 59,870 
2002: 60,674 
2003: 61,034 
2004: 61,395 
2005: 61,704 
2006: 62,151

Geography
Mercedes Partido is situated in the Undulated Pampa (Pampa Ondulada), one of the subregions of the Pampas. It owes its name to a series of undulations, or the way the terrain descends gradually to the banks of the Paraná River. It extends north of the Salado River in Buenos Aires Province, from Samborombón Bay to the northeast, to the provinces of Córdoba and Santa Fe.

Climate
As in the rest of the Undulated Pampa, Mercedes's climate is humid-temperate, characterized by:

 Four distinct seasons. 
 The moderating influence on temperatures by being near to the Atlantic Ocean.
 The free circulation of Atlantic humid winds, due to the flat terrain.

Average temperature and rainfall in the city of Mercedes for the 1983 - 2000 period:

January:  - 
February:  - 
March:  - 
April:  - 
May:  - 
June:  - 
July:  - 
August:  - 
September:  - 
October:  - 
November:  - 
December:  - 
Summer:  - 
Fall:  - 
Winter:  - 
Spring:  - 
Annual:  -

External links

 
 Mercedes Ya
 Noticias Mercedinas

 
Partidos of Buenos Aires Province
States and territories established in 1752